Vasilkovo is a rural locality (a selo) in Pavlovskoye Rural Settlement, Suzdalsky District, Vladimir Oblast, Russia. The population was 24 as of 2010. There are 7 streets.

Geography 
Vasilkovo is located on the right bank of the Nerl River, 26 km southeast of Suzdal (the district's administrative centre) by road. Vasilkovo-2 is the nearest rural locality.

References 

Rural localities in Suzdalsky District
Suzdalsky Uyezd